The Boise Mountains are a mountain range in the U.S. state of Idaho, spanning part of Boise and Sawtooth national forests.

References 

Mountain ranges of Idaho